The Santa Marta mountain tanager (Anisognathus melanogenys), also known as the black-cheeked mountain tanager, is a species of bird in the family Thraupidae. It is endemic to highland forest in the Santa Marta Mountains in Colombia. It is closely related to the widespread lacrimose mountain tanager, but the distributions of the two do not overlap.

References

Santa Marta mountain tanager
Birds of the Sierra Nevada de Santa Marta
Endemic birds of Colombia
Santa Marta mountain tanager
Santa Marta mountain tanager
Santa Marta mountain tanager
Taxonomy articles created by Polbot